Gersten is a surname. Notable people with the surname include:

Bernard Gersten (1923-2020), American theatrical producer
Dennis Gersten, American actor and director 
Gerry Gersten (1927-2017), American political caricaturist
Joe Gersten (born 1947), American politician
Stephen M. Gersten (born 1940), American mathematician